The 2021–22 Sydney FC (A-League Women) season is the club's 14th season in the A-League Women (formerly the W-League), the premier competition for women's football in Australia.

Squad

Transfers

Transfers in

Transfers out

W-League

League table

Matches

 All times are in AEDT

Finals series

Awards

End of season awards 
The following players received awards at the Sydney FC Sky Blue Ball for their achievements throughout the season:
Player of the Season: Mackenzie Hawkesby
Member's Player of the Season: Cortnee Vine
U-20's Player of the Season: Taylor Ray
Golden Boot: Cortnee Vine (9 goals)

See also 
 2021–22 Sydney FC season

References 

Sydney FC (A-League Women) seasons
2021–22 A-League Women by team